= Le Roy Crummer =

American cardiologist

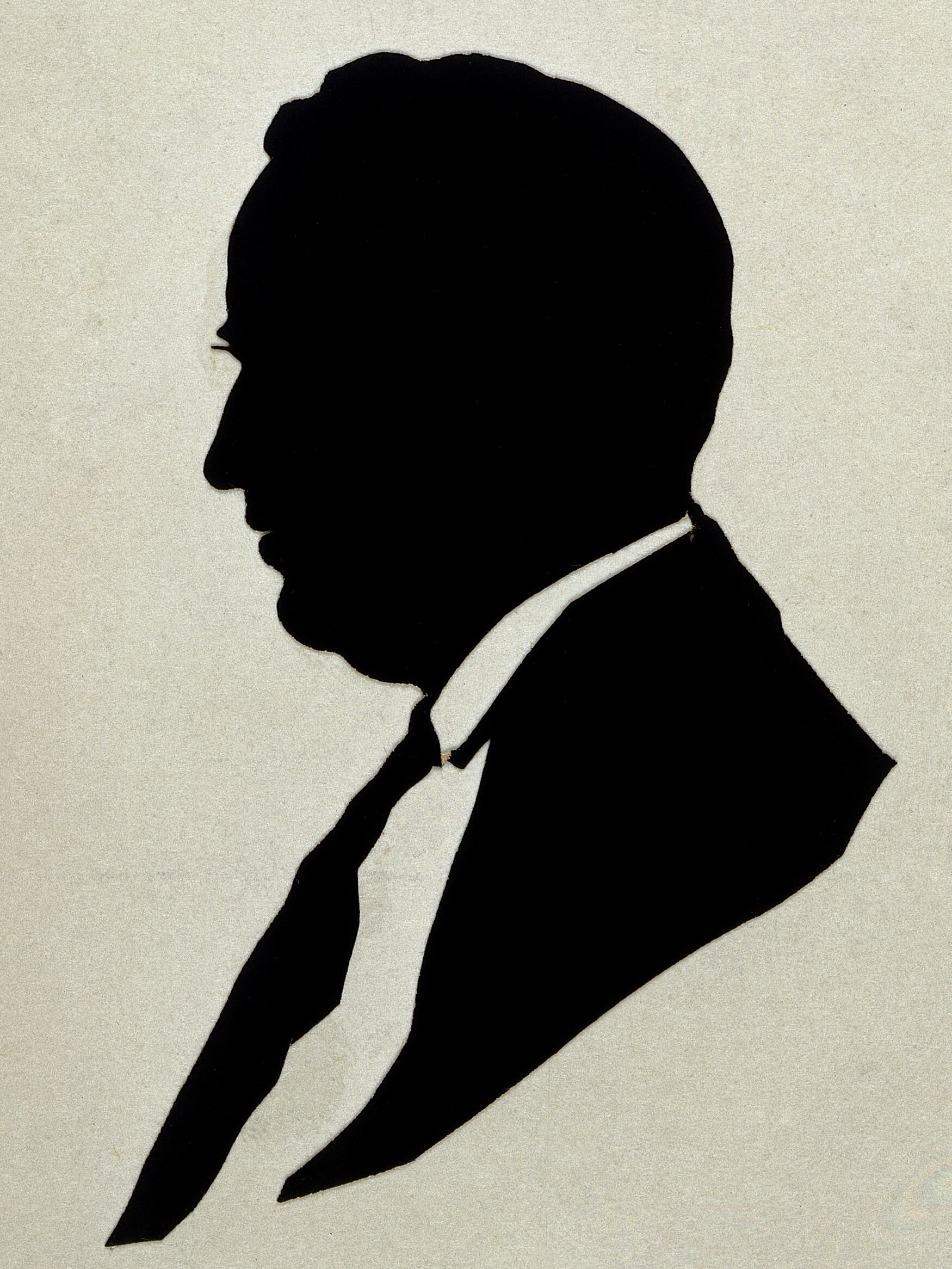
Image of LeRoy Crummer

Le Roy Crummer (c. 1871 – January 2, 1934) was an expert on heart disease. He attended the University of Michigan and Northwestern University, and was a member of the Royal Society of Medicine. During World War I he was a captain in the US Army Medical Corps. He became Professor of the History of Medicine, first at the University of California and later at the University of Southern California. He was associate editor of the journal Annals of Medical History.

== Works ==
- Clinical Features of Heart Disease
